Živojin Jocić (1870–1914) was a Serbian chemist.

In organic chemistry, the Jocic reaction, also called the Jocic–Reeve reaction (named after Żivojin Jocić and Wilkins Reeve) is a name reaction that involves nucleophilic displacement of the hydroxyl group in a 1,1,1-trichloro-2-hydroxyalkyl structure with concomitant conversion of the trichloromethyl portion to a carboxylic acid or similar functional group. 

At the turn of the century, Živojin Jocić worked as an assistant at the University of Petrograd in Imperial Russia. In a relatively short time – between 1897 and 1911 – he published a large number of papers in organic chemistry, for the most part dealing with the synthesis of acetylene hydrocarbons and synthesis by means of Grignard reagent.

See also
 Jocic reaction
 Sima Lozanić
 Marko Leko
 Mihailo Rašković
 Aleksandar M. Leko
 Milivoje Lozanić
 Dejan Popović Jekić
 Panta Tutundžić
 Vukić Mićović
 Persida Ilić
 Svetozar Lj. Jovanović
 Djordje K. Stefanović

References 

1870 births
1914 deaths
Serbian chemists